KNWS-LD, virtual channel 64 (UHF digital channel 27), is a low-power Novelisima-affiliated television station licensed to Brownsville, Texas, United States. The station is owned by HC2 Holdings. KNWS-LD's programming is also seen on KAZH-LD channel 35 and KRZG-CD channel 32 in McAllen, Texas.

The Rio Grande Delta is one of three markets to receive both Azteca America and the original TV Azteca channels (San Diego, El Paso and Laredo are the others). Much of KNWS-LD's programming from Azteca America can also be seen on XHOR-TV (Azteca 7) or XHMTA-TV / XHREY-TV (Azteca 13), sometimes simultaneously.

KNWS-LD was formerly known as KBDF-LP, and KAZH-LD was formerly known as KNDF-LP; the call letters were changed in 2011, after Una Vez Mas acquired the former KNWS-TV in Houston and renamed it KYAZ. The KBDF and KNDF call letters both referred to XHDF-TV, one of TV Azteca's flagship stations.

Subchannels

Newscast
In early 2007, KBDF-LP, which was then renamed as KNWS-LP in 2011, planned to start a local newscast, which would be produced in Davenport, Iowa by the Independent News Network.  However, as of September 2007, it had not yet debuted.

References

External links

Buzzr affiliates
Classic Reruns TV affiliates
Innovate Corp.
Mass media in Brownsville, Texas
Television stations in the Lower Rio Grande Valley
Television channels and stations established in 2000
Spanish-language television stations in Texas